Cyclophora poeciloptera is a moth in the  family Geometridae. It is found in Ivory Coast and Nigeria.

References

Moths described in 1920
Cyclophora (moth)
Insects of West Africa
Moths of Africa